Sinomonas mesophila is a Gram-positive bacterium from the genus Sinomonas which has been isolated from soil from Bidar Fort, India.

References

Bacteria described in 2015
Micrococcaceae